Latergaz-e Sofla (also Romanized as Latergāz-e Soflá; also known as Latergāz) is a village in Zarem Rud Rural District, Hezarjarib District, Neka County, Mazandaran Province, Iran. At the 2006 census, its population was 49, in 13 families.

References 

Populated places in Neka County